Babu Jandel is an Indian politician who represents the Sheopur constituency. He is a member of the Indian National Congress political party.

Political Career
He was elected the Sarpanch of Gram Panchayat Sonthwa in the year 1994. He was elected as an MLA for the first time in 2018.

Controversy
An FIR was registered against himm for hurling abuses at a woman police officer in Sheopur.

References 

Year of birth missing (living people)
Living people
Madhya Pradesh MLAs 2018–2023
Sheopur district
Indian National Congress politicians from Madhya Pradesh